That's Entertainment! is a 1960 album by the American vocalist Judy Garland arranged by Jack Marshall and Conrad Salinger.

Garland turned to her former MGM  arranger Conrad Salinger for four full orchestra-backed songs, including the title track, “I’ve Confessed to the Breeze” from No, No, Nanette  and ”Alone Together” which was selected for The Band Wagon   but not ultimately used in the film.

Reception
The Allmusic review by William Ruhlmann awarded the album three stars and said "Five years into her tenure at Capitol Records, Judy Garland had slipped from the top rung of the label's concerns...Nevertheless, the results were engaging. Garland was in good voice and sang with assurance, resulting in another terrific collection.

Track listing
 "That's Entertainment!" (Howard Dietz, Arthur Schwartz) - 2:31
 "Who Cares?" (George Gershwin, Ira Gershwin) - 1:31
 "I've Confessed to the Breeze (I Love You)" (Otto Harbach, Vincent Youmans) - 3:07
 "If I Love Again" (Jack Murray, Ben Oakland) - 2:42
 "Yes" (Dory Previn, André Previn) - 3:14
 "Puttin' on the Ritz" (Irving Berlin) - 1:59
 "Old Devil Moon" (Yip Harburg, Burton Lane) - 2:57
 "Down with Love" (Harold Arlen, Harburg) - 2:11
 "How Long Has This Been Going On?" (Gershwin, Gershwin) - 2:53
 "It Never Was You" (Maxwell Anderson, Kurt Weill) - 3:25
 "Just You, Just Me" (Jesse Greer, Raymond Klages) - 1:42
 "Alone Together" (Dietz, Schwartz) - 3:18

Personnel
Judy Garland - vocals
Jack Marshall - arranger and  conductor; guitar solos
Conrad Salinger - orchestral arrangements
Milt Raskin - piano accompaniment

References

Capitol Records albums
Albums arranged by Jack Marshall (composer)
albums produced by Voyle Gilmore
Judy Garland albums
1960 albums